Temple Emanu-El was a large synagogue on Fifth Avenue and 43rd Street in Midtown Manhattan, New York City. Built in 1868, it is now demolished.

History 
In 1868, Emanu-El erected a new building for the first time, a Moorish Revival structure by Leopold Eidlitz, assisted by Henry Fernbach at 43rd Street and 5th Avenue after raising about $650,000. It was demolished in 1927.

Gallery

References

 Kathryn E. Holliday, Leopold Eidlitz: Architecture and Idealism in the Gilded Age. New York: W. W. Norton, 2008, p. 71 ff.

External links
 https://emanuelnyc.org/wp-content/uploads/2018/12/1860sEmanuel.jpg
 https://nyc-architecture.com/GON/GON025.htm

Buildings and structures demolished in 1927
Demolished buildings and structures in Manhattan
Fifth Avenue
Midtown Manhattan
Reform synagogues in New York City
Religious buildings and structures completed in 1868
Religious organizations established in 1868